A Pleasant Shade of Gray is the eighth studio album by progressive metal band Fates Warning, released on April 22, 1997 through Metal Blade Records.  It is a concept album, and contains one song divided into twelve parts and is noted for its darker mood and more progressive style.

Overview
A Pleasant Shade Of Gray is a single song that is divided into twelve tracks.  The album is notable for its darker mood and mixture of progressive rock and metal with hints of industrial, classical, and psychedelia.  Jim Matheos wrote the album following Fates Warning's 1994 tour in support of Inside Out, with Matheos mailing tapes to Ray Alder and Mark Zonder.  The record was recorded after two weeks of live rehearsals.  It took approximately one month in Carriage House studio with Terry Brown producing to complete the recording. Then-former Armored Saint bassist Joey Vera and former Dream Theater keyboard player Kevin Moore were recruited to complete the recording lineup of Matheos, Alder, and Zonder.

Matheos said that the genesis of A Pleasant Shade of Gray'''s stark departure was the similarity of the previous two albums.  "I think all of our records have been drastically different with the exception of Inside Out and Parallels [...] Looking back, that might not have been such a good move. We repeated ourselves and when we stepped away from it at the end of touring with it we weren't pleased with that; so this time we've done something radically different."

In 2007 the album was re-released by Metal Blade Europe with a bonus DVD of the Pleasant Shade of Gray Live video, previously only on VHS.

Reception

Sputnikmusic gave the album 4.5 stars and noted that the album has held up well with the passage of time: "It wasn't until later that people began to regard A Pleasant Shade of Gray in a more positive light, and its popularity subsequently grew as the album is now considered inimitable in the progressive genre."
In 2005, the album was ranked number 416 in Rock Hard magazine's book of The 500 Greatest Rock & Metal Albums of All Time.

However, AllMusic panned the album, criticizing "the guitar riffs and melodic hooks [as] simply not that memorable, requiring way too many listens before leaving any lasting impressions and overshadowing the band's remarkable musicianship [...] All told, A Pleasant Shade of Gray is a challenging listen and not for the faint of heart."

Track listing

Part XII actually ends at 7:46, it is then followed by a 31 seconds of silence and 31 second alarm-clock ringing sound to signify the end of a dream.

Credits
Band
 Ray Alder – vocals
 Jim Matheos – guitar, guitar synth
 Mark Zonder – drums
 Joey Vera – bass
 Kevin Moore – keyboards
 Bill Metoyer, Lydia Montagnese, Mark Zonder, Terry Brown, Lindsay Matheos - additional voices

Production and art
 Terry Brown - production, recording and mixing
 Andy Katz and Joe Peccerillo - assistant engineering
 Eddy Schreyer - mastering
 Bill Metoyer - pre-production
 Ioannis and Steve Jacaruso at Vivid Images - art direction and design
 Ioannis and Heide Coyle - photography

The credits thank former bassist Joe DiBiase, who departed the band in 1995; A Pleasant Shade of Grey'' was the first Fates Warning album without DiBiase.

References

Fates Warning albums
1997 albums
Concept albums
Albums produced by Terry Brown (record producer)
Metal Blade Records albums